The Fencing Association of India (FAI) is the governing body for the sport of fencing in India and is recognized by the Indian Olympic Association (IOA) as one of its National Sports Association members. It is affiliated to the Asian Fencing Confederation, Commonwealth Fencing Federation and Fédération Internationale d'Escrime (FIE). It was founded in 1974 and recognized by Indian Government in 1997.

Competitions
The association has been holding national competitions in Sub-Junior  (1999) Jaipur Rajasthan, Cadet (2004) Cheenai Tamilnaidu, Junior (1992), and Senior (1986) categories, both for boys/men and girls/women.

State and services federations

There are currently 30 state associations and 2 services associations (SSB and SSPB) affiliated with the Fencing Association of India.

 Andhara  State Fencing Association
 Arunachal Pradesh Fencing Association
 Assam Fencing Association
 Bihar State Fencing Association
 Bengal State Fencing Association
 Chandigarh, Dadar & Nagar Haveli Fencing Association
 Chhattisgarh Pradesh Fencing Association
 Delhi State Fencing Association
 The Goa Fencing Association 
 Amateur Fencing Association of Gujarat State 
 Haryana State Fencing Association
 Himachal Pradesh State Fencing Association
 Jharkhand Fencing Association
 J & K State Fencing Association
 Karnataka Fencing Association

 Kerala State Fencing Association
 Madhya Pradesh Fencing Association
 Maharashtra State Fencing Association
 Manipur State Fencing Association
 Meghalaya Fencing Association
 Mizoram State Fencing Association
 Nagaland Fencing Association
 Orissa Fencing Association
 Pondicherry Armature State Fencing Association
 Punjab State Fencing Association
 Rajasthan State Fencing Association
 Tamil Nadu State Fencing Association
 Fencing Association of Tripura 
 Uttar Pradesh State Fencing Association
 Uttarakhand Pradesh Fencing Association

 Services Sports Control Board
 SSB

References

Fencing in India
Sports governing bodies in India
National members of the Asian Fencing Confederation
1974 establishments in Punjab, India
Sports organizations established in 1974